Spagnuolo is an Italian surname, meaning literally "Spanish or "from Spain" and may refer to:

 Giovanni Spagnuolo, Italian engineer
 Giuseppe Crespi, nicknamed "Lo Spagnuolo", Italian painter
 Jason Spagnuolo, Australian soccer player
 Steve Spagnuolo, Defensive coordinator of Kansas City Chiefs of the National Football League

See also

 Spagnola
 Spagnolo

Italian toponymic surnames
Ethnonymic surnames